Man Law may refer to:

Man Laws, beer commercials
Man Law, Burma, a town in Kachin State

See also
Mann Act